Seconds of Pleasure is a 1980 album by Rockpile, a band consisting of guitarists/vocalists Dave Edmunds and Billy Bremner, bassist/vocalist Nick Lowe, and drummer Terry Williams. The band had played together on various solo albums by Edmunds and Lowe in previous years, but Seconds of Pleasure would be the first (and only) album released under the Rockpile name.

The album's opening track, "Teacher, Teacher", became a minor hit on the Billboard Hot 100. The song was written by Kenny Pickett and Eddie Phillips, both of whom were former members of the 1960s British rock band The Creation. The song appears in the opening credits of the 2011 film, Bad Teacher.

A four-song EP, Nick Lowe & Dave Edmunds Sing the Everly Brothers, was included in the first pressings of the LP; the songs were later included on the album's various CD versions.

The front cover is a painting by the designer Barney Bubbles, who used pseudonyms and rarely signed his work. This is signed "Dag".

LP track listing
All songs written by Nick Lowe and Rockpile, unless otherwise indicated.

Side one
 "Teacher, Teacher" (Kenny Pickett, Eddie Phillips) – 2:36 lead vocal: Lowe
 "If Sugar Was As Sweet As You" (Joe Tex) – 2:35 lead vocal: Edmunds
 "Heart" – 2:38 lead vocal: Bremner
 "Now and Always" – 1:58 lead vocal: Lowe and Edmunds
 "A Knife and a Fork" (Kip Anderson, Isaiah Hennie, Charles Derrick) – 3:18 lead vocal: Edmunds
 "Play That Fast Thing (One More Time)" (Lowe) – 4:13 lead vocal: Lowe

Side two
 "Wrong Again (Let's Face It)" (Chris Difford, Glenn Tilbrook) – 2:23 lead vocal: Edmunds
 "Pet You and Hold You" – 3:13 lead vocal: Lowe
 "Oh What a Thrill" (Chuck Berry) – 3:06 lead vocal: Edmunds
 "When I Write the Book" – 3:17 lead vocal: Lowe
 "Fool Too Long" – 2:51 lead vocal: Edmunds
 "You Ain't Nothin' But Fine" (Sidney Simien, Floyd Soileau) – 2:54 lead vocal: Bremner

Bonus EP tracks (Nick Lowe & Dave Edmunds Sing The Everly Brothers)
produced by Nick Lowe & Dave Edmunds
 "Take a Message to Mary" (Felice Bryant, Boudleaux Bryant) – 2:28
 "Crying in the Rain" (Howard Greenfield, Carole King) – 2:04
 "Poor Jenny" (Felice Bryant, Boudleaux Bryant) – 2:28
 "When Will I Be Loved" (Phil Everly) – 2:14

CD reissue bonus tracks (2004)
 "Back to Schooldays" [Live] (Graham Parker) – 3:31 produced by Jeff Griffin
 "They Called It Rock" [Live] – 3:20 produced by Jeff Griffin
 "Crawling from the Wreckage" [Live] (Parker) – 3:07 produced by Chris Thomas

Personnel
Billy Bremner – guitar, vocals
Dave Edmunds – guitar, vocals, piano, organ
Nick Lowe – bass, vocals
Terry Williams – drums
Aldo Bocca – engineer

Charts
Album

Single

References

Albums produced by Nick Lowe
Albums produced by Dave Edmunds
1980 debut albums
Rockpile albums
Columbia Records albums